The 2005 college football season may refer to:

 2005 NCAA Division I-A football season
 2005 NCAA Division I-AA football season
 2005 NCAA Division II football season
 2005 NCAA Division III football season
 2005 NAIA Football National Championship